The 2016 Bahamas Bowl was a post-season American college football bowl game played on December 23, 2016 at Thomas Robinson Stadium in Nassau in the Bahamas. The third edition of the Bahamas Bowl featured the Eastern Michigan Eagles of the Mid-American Conference against the Old Dominion Monarchs of Conference USA. It began at 1:00 PM EST and aired on ESPN.  It was one of the 2016–17 bowl games concluding the 2016 FBS football season.  Sponsored by the Popeyes Louisiana Kitchen restaurant chain, the game was officially known as the Popeyes Bahamas Bowl.

Teams
The game featured the Eastern Michigan Eagles against the Old Dominion Monarchs.

This was the third meeting between the schools, with Old Dominion winning both previous ones.  The most recent meeting was on September 5, 2015, where the Monarchs defeated the Eagles by a score of 38–34.

Eastern Michigan Eagles

After finishing their regular season 7–5, bowl director Richard Giannini extended an invitation for the Eagles to play in the game, which they accepted.

This was the first bowl game for Eastern Michigan since the 1987 California Bowl where they defeated the San Jose State Spartans by a score of 30–27.

Old Dominion Monarchs

After finishing their regular season 9–3 and winning a share of the Conference USA East Division championship, Giannini extended an invitation for the Monarchs to play in the game, which they accepted.

This was the first FBS bowl game in school history for Old Dominion, in their third season as a member of the Football Bowl Subdivision and Conference USA, their second season of bowl eligibility, and their eighth season of the football program since resuming in 2009 following a 67-year hiatus.

Game summary

Scoring summary

Statistics

References

External links
Box score at ESPN

2016–17 NCAA football bowl games
2016
2016 Bahamas Bowl
2016 Bahamas Bowl
December 2016 sports events in North America
2016 in Bahamian sport